Aeginura is a genus of hydrozoans in the family Aeginidae.

Species
There are two recognized species in the genus Aeginura:

Invalid species
 Aeginura lanzarotae (Haeckel, 1879) [taxon inquirendum]
 Aeginura myosura  Haeckel, 1879 [taxon inquirendum]
 Aeginura nausithoe (Haeckel, 1879) [taxon inquirendum]

References

Aeginidae
Hydrozoan genera
Bioluminescent cnidarians